La Roda de Andalucía is a municipality of the Province of Seville, Andalusia, Spain. The density is 56.1 ihhab/km².

History
Historians recorded events in the area dating back to ancient Roman times, where battering rams and utensils have been found dating back to the civil war between Julius Caesar and Pompey that were used during the Battle of Munda. With the Christian reconquest of Ferdinand III of Castile, the border town became the Nazari Kingdom of Granada. La Roda, as the whole region of Estepa after the Reconquest, became the domains of the Order of Santiago. In 1559 Philip II of Spain established the Marquess of Estepa, to which the town belongs until the early nineteenth century. It is in this century that it undergoes a significant change with the arrival of the railroad (lines Córdoba-Málaga and La Roda-Utrera). Since 1916 La Roda is called "DE ANDALUCIA" to distinguish it from other La Rodas in Spain.

International relations

Twin towns — Sister cities
La Roda de Andalucía is twinned with:
 Castel Madama, Italy, since 2002

References

 La Roda de Andalucía - Multiterritorial Information System of Andalusia 
 La Roda de Andalucia Cultural Heritage of La Roda de Andalucía.IAPH Cultural Heritage 

Municipalities of the Province of Seville